Scaphander otagoensis is a species of sea snail, a marine opisthobranch gastropod mollusk in the family Scaphandridae, the canoe bubbles.

References

 Powell A. W. B., New Zealand Mollusca, William Collins Publishers Ltd, Auckland, New Zealand 1979

External links 
 ZipCodeZoo
 Photo

Scaphandridae
Gastropods described in 1956